

Introduction 
Barnabás Kelemen has established himself as one of the leading and most versatile artist of his generation.

An artist of “innate musicality” with a technical execution that belongs “only to the greatest” (The Guardian)

“...a penchant for fiery display and a lyricism suited to the stage, Barnabás Kelemen Hungarian soloist met the composer's demands unflappably, stirring a rousing ovation” as the soloist of the American Symphony Orchestra in Carnegie Hall's Stern Auditorium.” (New York Times)

Conquering the most famous concert halls in the world with his dynamic and passionate performances with his open-minded and individual playing he is an outstanding soloist chamber musician and conductor. As well he has been artistic director of festivals and professor at renowned institutions. In recent years he has been invited more and more as a jury member at world's leading violin and chamber music contests.

Due to his exceptional style sensitivity and his comprehensive technical proficiency, Barnabás Kelemen navigates with confidence through the entire catalogue of music written for violin. His repertoire is thus extremely diverse from solo, concerto, chamber music to string quartet works and he performs with incredible authenticity from early baroque, through classical, and romantic to contemporary music, with world- or Hungarian premieres of works by Kurtág, Ligeti, Schnittke, Gubajdulina, Steve Reich or Ryan Wigglesworth.

He regularly performs at the world's most prominent concert venues, including the Carnegie Hall, the Concertgebouw, the Royal Festival Hall, the Palais de Beaux Arts, the Suntory Hall, the Musikverein or the Berliner Philharmonie. He is a frequent guest of such eminent ensembles as the BBC Symphony, the London Philharmonic- and Symphony orchestras, the Amsterdam Concertgebouw Orchestra, the Berlin Radio Symphony, Hannover's NDR Radiophilharmonie, the Munich Symphony Orchestra, the Budapest Festival Orchestra or the Hungarian National Philharmonic Orchestra, the Estonian National Philharmonic Orchestra or the Helsinki Philharmonic Orchestra to name but a few.

Barnabás Kelemen has worked with conductors such as Lorin Maazel, Sir Neville Marriner, Vladimir Jurowski, Marek Janowski, Michael Stern, Krzysztof Urbanski, Zoltán Kocsis, Péter Eötvös, Iván Fischer... He is also an avid conductor himself – in recent seasons he has led the Hungarian National Philharmonic Orchestra, the Indianapolis Symphony Orchestra, the Austro- Hungarian Haydn Orchestra, the Dohnányi Symphony, the Israel Chamber Orchestra or the Amsterdam Concertgebouw Chamber Orchestra etc.

https://www.nytimes.com/2013/05/04/arts/music/american-symphony-orchestra-presents-hungary-torn.html

https://www.theguardian.com/music/2016/mar/03/bbcso-wigglesworth-review-barbican-britten-stravinsky-barnabas-kelemen

https://barnabaskelemen.com

Chamber Musician 
On top of all Barnabás Kelemen is a passionate chamber musician who has been playing regularly together with artists like Zoltán Kocsis, Joshua Bell, Schlomo Mintz, Miklós Perényi, Ferenc Rados, Maxim Rysanov, Steven Isserlis, Alina Ibragimova, Nicolas Altstaedt, Vilde Frang, José Gallardo or Andreas Ottensamer at chamber music festivals such as: Edinburgh, Jerusalem, Prussia Cove, Salzburg, Graz, Delft, Lockenhaus, Mondsee, Mantova, Kuhmo etc.

Recordings 
It was him who recorded all of Bartók's works for violin in the Bartók New Series under the aegis of Zoltán Kocsis, and many received international acclaim, especially his CD comprising the complete sonatas for violin which won the prestigious Gramophone Award in 2013. In 2001, his album of Liszt's complete works for violin and piano was awarded the Grand Prix du Disque by the International Liszt Society, while in 2003, Diapason magazine paid tribute to Kelemen and Tamás Vásáry's recording of Brahms’ Sonatas for Violin and Piano with its influential Diapason d’Or. So far, he has released a total of 22 albums – 19 solo/chamber music and three with his quartet – as well as a double DVD of live performances of Mozart's complete violin concertos. His album - released in 2019 under the care of Alpha Records - featuring Béla Bartók's Piano Quintet won its category at the BBC Music Magazine Awards and the Gramophone Award in 2020.

Pedagogue 
A devoted pedagogue since 2003 he is active as a violin and chamber music teacher giving masterclasses world-wide. Since 2003 he had been professor of violin later chamber music at the Ferenc Liszt Music Academy in Budapest and worked as a regular guest professor at the Indiana University in Bloomington/USA. Since 2013 he is a violin professor at the Cologne University in Germany as a successor of Zakhar Bronn and Viktor Tretyakov. He has been giving masterclasses at renowned institutions like Salzburg Mozarteum, Brussels Chapelle Rheine Elizabeth and at universities of Tokyo, Paris, Glasgow, Dallas, Toronto, Helsinki, Antwerpen, Brussels, Florance etc.

Barnabás Kelemen has been invited as jury member to prestigious international violin and chamber music/string quartet competitions like: Singapore, Wieniawsky (Poland), Szigeti (Hungary), Kloster Schöntaal (Germany), Bartók (Hungary), or Banff (Canada). He himself established two international violin competitions one in 2017 for violinists under age 21 during the Festival Academy Budapest named after Ilona Fehér with jury president Shlomo Mintz and a Central- European violin competition since 2020 in Miskolc named after Jenő Hubay with jury president

Boris Kuschnir.

Artistic Director 
Together with Katalin Kokas, he is the founder and artistic director of the Festival Academy Budapest which regularly features artists such as Joshua Bell, Vilde Frang, Maxim Rysanov, Nicolas Alsteadt, Andreas Ottensamer, Alina Ibragimova, Shlomo Mintz, Ferenc Rados or Gidon Kremer and hosts 50-60 university students from all over the world for masterclasses and to work and perform with the festival artists.

Founder of Kelemen Quartett 
In 2009 Barnabás Kelemen established the Kelemen Quartet with his wife Katalin Kokas. In their first years they have won the grand prizes of three of the greatest string quartet competitions, the Premio Paolo Borciani in Reggio Emilia, the Melbourne and the Beijing competitions and has kept the attention of the international quartet life with appearances at the NY Carnegie Hall, at the Berlin Philharmony, the Salzburg Mozarteum, the Vienna Musikverein, the Amsterdam Concertgebouw, the Teatro Fenice of Venice or at their yearly returns at the London Wigmore Hall since 2011. With their new members violinist Jonian Ilias Kadesha and cellist Vashti Mimosa Hunter the quartet recently appeared with their giant project of playing all Bartók string quartets at festivals like Mantova, Lockenhaus, Eisenstadt, Banff or Budapest Bartók Art Weeks Festival.

Competitions, and Awards 
Kelemen has achieved outstanding results at worlds greatest contests, including first prizes at both the 1999 Salzburg International Mozart Violin Competition and the 2002 International Violin Competition of Indianapolis, the third prize at Brussels’ 2001 Queen Elisabeth Violin Competition. His artistry has been recognized with the highest professional and state honors: he has been awarded Liszt, Bartók-Pásztory and Kossuth Prizes, Prima and the London-based Gramophone Awards, and is the holder of the Knight's Cross of the Order of Merit of the Republic of Hungary.

Life Plans 
With his wife and four children they are currently building an arts-farm on a 13.000 quadratmeter land with three old houses in an 18 inhabited magical village in Lendvajakabfa close to Maribor/ Graz but far from world's bustle. It will host season-through masterclasses camps concerts seminars or recordings in its barn-concert-hall-theater.. Will accommodate up to 20 students in 2 persons condos/apartments and up to 4 guest professors with their spouses in their separate apartments. It will be a unique place to forget time and to sink in work in symbiosis with nature. The Kokas- Kelemen couple plans to spend most of the time of their lives at their farm that opens in the spring of 2022.

Studies 
Barnabás Kelemen began studying the violin under Valéria Baranyai. As a student of Eszter Perényi, he graduated from the Liszt Academy of Music in 2001. He was enormously influenced by his later masters, Isaac Stern (1994-2001), Ferenc Rados (1993-), and Zoltán Kocsis (1998-2016), and by the several recordings and movie films of his grandfather from the 1930s (legendary gypsy ‘prímás’ violinist Pali Pertis). He studied conducting from two legends of the Finnish school, Leif Segerstam and Jorma Panula. He is currently a professor at two illustrious institutions: at the Ferenc Liszt Academy in Budapest where he coaches chamber music groups at regular masterclasses and teaches violin at the University of Cologne.

Violin 
He performs on the “ex-Dénes Kovács” Guarneri del Gesú violin of 1742, generously loaned to him by the Hungarian State and on a period baroque violin made by Januarius Gagliano in 1771.

Sources 
https://barnabaskelemen.com

References 

 "Barnabás Kelemen". Budapest Music Center. Retrieved 2010-01-25.
 New York Times, on Barnabas Kelemen
 The Guardian on Barnabas Kelemen
 "Kelemen Barnabás" (in Hungarian). Liszt Ferenc Zeneművészeti Egyetem (Liszt Ferenc Academy of Music). Archived from the original on 2011-07-19. Retrieved 2010-01-25.
 https://fesztivalakademia.hu/en/

External links 

 Official website
 https://fesztivalakademia.hu/en/https://fesztivalakademia.hu/en/

References

External links
 Official website

1978 births
Living people
Hungarian classical violinists
Male classical violinists
Prize-winners of the Queen Elisabeth Competition
Knight's Crosses of the Order of Merit of the Republic of Hungary (civil)
21st-century classical violinists
21st-century Hungarian male musicians